Fort Bute (1766-1779) was a colonial fort built by the British in 1766 to protect the confluence of Bayou Manchac with the Mississippi River and was named in honor of the  Earl of Bute. Fort Bute was located on Bayou Manchac, about 115 miles (185 km) up the Mississippi River from New Orleans, on the far western border of British West Florida. It was one of the three outposts maintained by the British in the lower Mississippi along with Fort Panmure and the Baton Rouge outpost.

Passage to Mobile
On October 20, 1763, Major Robert Farmar of the Thirty-fourth Regiment and Commander of His Britannic Majesty's troops declared that all of the inhabitants of West Florida were subjects of England. The British led by Colonel Taylor began clearing out the Iberville River and building a path from British West Florida to the "14th British colony" of Mobile. Captain James Campbell along with 50 African slaves cleared a channel to the Mississippi River. It was during this time that Major Robert Farmar planned to build Fort Bute for protecting the workers and local settlers.

Fort construction
In the year 1765 construction materials and an engineer named Archibald Robertson from Pensacola arrived in Bayou Manchac. Archibald Robertson supervised the planning and construction of Fort Bute. The fort consisted of a single blockhouse surrounded by a stockade. The fort was designed to hold up to 200 men with a single officers quarters.

Capture of Fort Bute
On September 3, 1779 Colonel Alexander Dickson removed nearly all the troops from the fort leaving only 23 soldiers at the fort. The troops were ordered to march to the Baton Rouge outpost. Bernardo de Gálvez, the Governor of Spanish Louisiana and Commander of the troops of the Catholic Majesty gathered 1,427 militiamen consisting of 600 multinational settlers and 160 Native Americans and 667 Spanish infantrymen. Gálvez slowly marched his troops towards Bayou Manchac through the muddy swamp at nine miles each day. The Spanish arrived at Fort Bute 11 days after beginning the march.

At dawn on September 7, 1779  the Spanish captured Fort Bute with no casualties. One British Captain, one Lieutenant and eighteen soldiers were taken as prisoners. Three British soldiers ran away from the battle and fled towards Baton Rouge.

References 

Louisiana in the American Revolution
Fort Bute
Fort Bute
Fort Bute
1779 in the United States
Conflicts in 1779
East Baton Rouge Parish, Louisiana
Colonial forts in Louisiana
New Richmond
British-American culture in Louisiana
Pre-statehood history of Louisiana
Military installations established in 1766
1766 establishments in the British Empire
Military installations closed in 1779
1779 disestablishments in the Spanish Empire